The Big 12 Conference Men's Basketball Player of the Year is a basketball award given to the Big 12 Conference's most outstanding player. The award was first given following the 1996–97 season, the first year of conference competition but three years after the conference's official formation. It is selected by the league's head coaches, who are not allowed to vote for their own players.

Kansas has had the most individual winners of the award with 11. Only two players have won the award multiple times, Raef LaFrentz of Kansas, who won the first two awards in 1997 and 1998, and Buddy Hield of Oklahoma, who won the award in 2015 and 2016. Four freshmen have won the award as well, Kevin Durant of Texas, Michael Beasley of Kansas State and Marcus Smart and Cade Cunningham of Oklahoma State. Three current Big 12 members have yet to have a winner: charter member Baylor, and 2012 arrivals TCU and West Virginia. Three former Big 12 members also never had a winner of the award during their tenure in the Big 12: Colorado, Missouri, and Texas A&M.

Key

Winners

Winners by school

See also
Big 12 Conference Men's Basketball Coach of the Year
Big Eight Conference Men's Basketball Player of the Year – the predecessor to the Big 12 Conference and its players of the year (although the Big 12 does not recognize Big Eight Players of the Year as their own)

References

Awards established in 1997
Player
NCAA Division I men's basketball conference players of the year